Three Lions (The Official England Team Game), released in North America as Alexi Lalas International Soccer, is a video game developed by Z-Axis and published by Take-Two Interactive, based on European football (soccer). It was released for the PC, PlayStation and Game Boy Color on 17 April 1998 and in 1999 as the official video game of the English Football Association. Originally announced under the title "Major League Soccer", it was also marketed under other names in other regions, including Golden Goal 98, Bomba:98 All Champions Challenge, Mundial:98 and Pro:Foot Contest 98.

Cover Stars 
Editions of the game in different regions feature native international footballers. In France, Pro:Foot Contest 98 features Didier Deschamps, in Italy, Bomba:98 All Champions Challenge features Roberto Di Matteo, in North America, Alexi Lalas International Soccer features Alexi Lalas.

Reception

The PlayStation version received unfavorable reviews according to the review aggregation website GameRankings. 

Next Generation said, "If you're looking for speedy, no-nonsense physical play, you could do a lot worse than Alexi Lalas International Soccer."

Extreme Playstation rated the game an 85 of 100 stating that " Three Lions doesn't boast great graphics and has a few niggling flaws(like the omission of any type analog control), but there's enough innovation and gameplay here to give the other World Cup bandwagon games a run for their money

References

External links
 

1998 video games
Association football video games
Game Boy Color games
PlayStation (console) games
Video games developed in the United States
Windows games
Take-Two Interactive games
Video games scored by Allister Brimble